East Schodack is a hamlet in Rensselaer County, New York, United States. It comprises the ZIP code of 12063.

It is located southeast of Albany and Troy, New York, in the town of Schodack.  It is located in the northeastern corner of the town, and was formerly called Scotts Corners, which is also the name of a hamlet in Westchester County.

New York Route 150 is the main highway in the community.

The East Schodack Fire District, the local fire department, had an election on December 9, 2009.

Demographics

Important businesses and sights
Stable Gate Farm and Lodge is a wedding venue and winery

Famous residents

References

External links
 Town of Schodack online
 East Schodack, New York on Yahoo

Hamlets in New York (state)
Hamlets in Rensselaer County, New York